Stanislav Čeček (13 November 1886 in Líšno – 29 May 1930 in České Budějovice) was a Czechoslovak general.

Biography
Stanislav Čeček was born in Líšno (today part of Bystřice near Benešov), Austria-Hungary. His father, Karel, was a forester, and Čeček went to the municipal school in Bystřice and then grammar school in Tábor before attending Prague Business Academy and Leipzig Business School. He joined Prague's 102nd Infantry Regiment as a lieutenant in served in 1907 and worked as a banker. He moved to Moscow in 1911 and worked at the Moscow office of Laurin & Klement company.

When the World War I began, Čeček joined the "Czech team" of Russia Army. On 31 March 1917 he was awarded by Order of St. George (4th degree). Later he took part in the formation of the Czechoslovak Legion and became a commander of the 4th Regiment.

In May 1918 Čeček took part in the Revolt of the Czechoslovak Legion and became commander-in-chief of the Volga Front of People Army of Komuch. In October 1918 he went to Vladivostok and was evacuated from Russia in September 1920.

In Czechoslovakia Čeček became a deputy chief of the General Staff. During 1921-1923 he studied in France at École spéciale militaire de Saint-Cyr. After returning he received a rank of division general and became a chief of president's Military Office. From 1926 he was a chief of Aviation Department in the Defense Ministry. From 1928 he became a commander of 5th Infantry Division in České Budějovice.

He was also awarded Order of Saint Sava and Order of the White Eagle.

References

Russian military personnel of World War I
Czechoslovak Legion
Czech generals
People from Benešov District
People of the Russian Civil War
1886 births
1930 deaths
Knights of the Order of the Falcon (Czechoslovakia)
Recipients of the Order of St. Sava
Austro-Hungarian expatriates in the Russian Empire